Thomas Kiernan (January 13, 1933 – December 22, 2003) was an American writer who specialized in biography.

Kiernan was the author of a vast assortment of biographies that featured celebrities, literary luminaries, scientists, sports stars, psychologists, and political figures and their associates.  He wrote biographies of Laurence Olivier, Jane Fonda, John Steinbeck, and Yasser Arafat.

Biography
Born in Jersey City, New Jersey, he was raised in Orange and attended Newark Academy. Kiernan earned his bachelor of arts degree in 1956from the University of Notre Dame in South Bend, Indiana.

He served in the United States military from 1956 to 1958, when he began graduate studies in philosophy.

In the 1970s and 1980s, he was the highly acclaimed biographer of such diverse notables as Jane Fonda, John Steinbeck, Yaser Arafat, Laurence Olivier and Roman Polanski.

He was a personal acquaintance and occasional tennis partner of Rupert Murdoch, the subject of his biography, Citizen Murdoch.

Awards

In 1976 he won the Anisfield-Wolf Book Award for his book The Arabs, a comprehensive study of the Arab world. In researching this book, he traveled extensively throughout the Middle East to interview scores of prominent Arab spokesmen, including Yasir Arafat.

Break in

According to an article in The New York Times dated November 27, 1975, a completed manuscript of a biography on Bebe Rebozo, an associate of Richard Nixon's, that was scheduled to be published by Farrar,’ Straus & Giroux was stolen from the home of Thomas Kiernan.  In addition to Rebozo's biography "several tape recordings of interviews and several research files, including one file containing all of Mr. Kiernan's book contracts and another containing all his royalty statements, were taken." Other news coverage at the time pointed out at the time that "thieves ignored" jewelry and other items of value.

Death
He died at his home in Peapack-Gladstone, New Jersey on December 22, 2003.

Bibliography

Biographies
Shrinks, etc.: a consumer's guide to psychotherapies (1974)
The Arabs : their history, aims, and challenge to the industrialized world (1975)
Arafat, the man and the myth (1976)

The intricate music : a biography of John Steinbeck' (1979)Sir Larry : the life of Laurence Olivier (1981)Jane Fonda: Heroine for our Time (1982)Citizen Murdoch'' (1986)

Citations

1933 births
2003 deaths
American biographers
Newark Academy alumnix
People from Orange, New Jersey
People from Peapack-Gladstone, New Jersey
University of Notre Dame alumni
Writers from Jersey City, New Jersey
20th-century American writers